Barway is a hamlet in Cambridgeshire, England, about three miles south of Ely. It is on Soham Lode, which flows into the River Cam. The population is included in the civil parish of Soham.

External links

Hamlets in Cambridgeshire
Soham